Kemneriella is a genus of moths in the family Sesiidae.

Species
Kemneriella malaiseorum Bryk, 1947

References

Sesiidae